I. G. – Inspector General is a 2009 Indian Malayalam-language action drama film written and directed by B. Unnikrishnan. The film stars Suresh Gopi in the title lead role followed by Nandini and Ashish Vidyarthi in supporting roles.

Plot 
In Kerala, IG Durga Prasad is the head of Traffic Police, who takes into custody a gang of criminals who involved in hawala transactions. The CM calls a meeting to ascertain the source of the money. Actually, the money is intended for terrorist activities. Knowing the serious situation, the CM orders to form the ATS squad, where Durga Prasad is made as the chief of the squad. The DGP and the ADGP provide complete necessary support to him. Once in a week he has to report the developments to the CM. It is at this time when an allegation comes out that I.G is harassing some fellows who are suspected to be encouraging the terrorists. 

Scaria Zacariah, a business tycoon is the main brain behind the blasts that occurred in Kerala and the terror groups. The city police commissioner VIjaybhaskar, who is a corrupt cop, is an ally of Scaria who is responsible for instigating riots in the slums. One or two persons in the department itself are against Durga Prasad. Though under the heavy pressure, Durga Prasad does not give up the enquiry, where everyone encourages and allows him to carry on with the mission after knowing about the seriousness of the situation. Durga Prasad tries his level best to put an end to the terrorist activities. With the order from the CM and the DGP, Durga Prasad arrests the city commissioner who was the murderer of the home secretary and also had links with the terrorists. 

Durga Prasad finds out about the terrorists's plans and hideouts where he goes there for the endgame. The perpetrators had already planned to escape from Kerala, but Durga reached their hideout on time, thus foiling their entire plans. After a wild fight, Durga Prasad shoots down Scaria and kills Yasir Shah by drowning him in the nearby river. Durga Prasad finds that his own younger brother, Vinod Krishna is involved with the terrorists. He kills Vinod with his mother's permission and puts an end to the terrorist rampage in Kerala. Durga Prasad is honoured by the entire state for his bravery and actions.

Cast 

 Suresh Gopi as IG Durga Prasad IPS, The Chief of ATS-Kerala
 Govind Padmasoorya as Vinod Krishna, Durga's brother
 Siddique as SP Saheer Ahmed IPS, ATS - Operations wing chief - (Extended cameo)
 Nandini as Adv. Yamini
 Lakshmi	as Durga and Vinod's mother
 Anaitha Nair as Chandini, Vinod's love interest
 Rajan P. Dev as Chief Minister of Kerala Ramachandran
 Vijayaraghavan as DYSP George Varghese aka Vakkachan, ATS officer
 Sai Kumar as Beerankutty Sahib, Chandini's father and ex-minister
 Devan as DGP Varghese Philip IPS, State Police Chief
 John Kokkan as Yasir Shah (the main antagonist) 
 Jagathy Sreekumar as SI Damodaran Pillai, ATS officer
 Santhosh as ADGP Yusuf IPS, State Intelligence Wing Chief
 Kiran Raj as ASP Diwakar IPS, ATS officer
 Ashish Vidyarthi as Skaria Zakariya
 Subair as City Police Commissioner Vijayabhaskar IPS
 Biju Pappan as Mujeeb
 Ambika Mohan as Chandini's mother
 V.K Sreeraman as Paul Joseph IAS, Home Secretary
 Reshmi Boban as Paul Joseph's wife
 Sivaji Guruvayoor as Dineshan, Party Secretary

Reception 

Paresh C Palicha from Rediff.com wrote "To sum up, IG is just an average Suresh Gopi fare". Sify.com wrote that "
Govind Padmasurya definitely has a future in Malayalam film, while other characters like Jagathy and Vijayraghavan disappear half way through. Is the role of Nandini as a smart lawyer necessary? At most the film is a time pass entertainer which is racy and briskly told though the story and situations are all ?old wine in new bottle?."

References

External links

2009 films
2000s Malayalam-language films
Films scored by M. Jayachandran
Films about terrorism in India
Fictional portrayals of the Kerala Police
Films shot in Thiruvananthapuram
Films directed by B. Unnikrishnan